Peoples Multi-purpose High School, Ankola (1953) is one of the oldest high schools in Uttar Kannada district. It was the first high school founded by the Kanara Welfare Trust. This school is found by Dinakara Desai. This school has celebrated its 60 years.

The former headmasters
 S. V. Pikle
 Ramakantha Narvekar
 U K Udupa
 N. B. Kamath
 S. G. Keni

Current headmaster
 Ravindra Keni

Notable students
 Govindray H. Nayak

References
 "Karnataka State Gazetteer"

Schools in Uttara Kannada district
High schools and secondary schools in Karnataka
Educational institutions established in 1941
1941 establishments in India